Polypompholyx laciniata is a taxonomic synonym that has been used to refer to:

Utricularia longeciliata syn. Polypompholyx laciniata Benj.
Utricularia simulans syn. Polypompholyx laciniata Benj.

Utricularia by synonymy